Paranecepsia is a plant genus of the family Euphorbiaceae first described as a genus in 1976. It contains only one known species, Paranecepsia alchorneifolia, native to southeastern Africa (eastern Tanzania and Niassa Province in northern Mozambique).

The species has been classified as vulnerable.

References

Monotypic Euphorbiaceae genera
Acalyphoideae
Vulnerable plants
Flora of Mozambique
Flora of Tanzania